Step into My World EP is an EP by the British rock band Hurricane #1, released in 1997. It features the Perfecto remix by Paul Oakenfold and Steve Osborne. It reached top 20 in the UK Singles Charts.

Track listing

CD CRESCD 276
 "Step Into My World (The Perfecto Radio Edit)" 
 "Step Into My World" 
 "If You Think It's Easy"
 "Never Mind the Rain" 

CD - Mixes CRESCD 276X
 "Step Into My World (The Perfecto Mix)"
 "Step Into My World (FC Kahuna Mix)"
 "Step Into My World (The Perfecto Dub)"
 "Step Into My World (Get It Together Mix)"

7" CRE 276
 "Step Into My World (The Perfecto Radio Edit)" 
 "If You Think It's Easy"

Personnel
"Step Into My World Ep"
1, Remix produced and mixed by Paul Oakenfold and Steve Osborne 
Remix engineer Danton Supple
Remix programming - Ben Hillier for 140dB
2, 3, 4, Produced by Stephen Harris and Andy Bell
Engineered and mixed by Stephen Harris
All songs written by Andy Bell (Creation Songs)
Photography by Tim Page
Design by Phantom Industries

1997 EPs
Creation Records EPs